Freḥa Bat Avraham (Hebrew: פריחא בת רבי אברהם בן אדיבה, died 1756), was a Jewish poet.

Bat Avraham was a member of the Moroccan Bar Adiba family, and emigrated from Tunis to Morocco in the 1730s with her father and brother. She was known for her scholarly knowledge, and was described as well-versed in Torah. She composed essays and poetry in Hebrew. As such, she was highly unusual for her sex, time, and place.

Freha died during the conquest of Tunis by the Algerians.  Her father had a synagogue built in her memory, which became a place of pilgrimage for Tunisian Jewish women. She was revered as a holy person, or kedoshah.

References 
 Emily Taitz, Sondra Henry & Cheryl Tallan,  The JPS Guide to Jewish Women: 600 B.C.E. to 1900 C.E., 2003

18th-century Jews
18th-century Moroccan women
Jewish poets
18th-century women writers
18th-century Moroccan poets